Murder by Death is a 1976 American comedy mystery film directed by Robert Moore and written by Neil Simon. The film stars Eileen Brennan, Truman Capote, James Coco, Peter Falk, Alec Guinness, Elsa Lanchester, David Niven, Peter Sellers, Maggie Smith, Nancy Walker, and Estelle Winwood.

The plot is a broad parody or spoof of the traditional country-house whodunit, familiar to mystery fiction fans of classics such as Agatha Christie's And Then There Were None. The cast is an ensemble of British and American actors playing send-ups of well-known fictional sleuths, including Hercule Poirot, Miss Marple, Charlie Chan, Nick and Nora Charles, and Sam Spade. It also features a rare acting performance by author Truman Capote.

The film was presented at the Venice International Film Festival on September 5, 1976.

Plot
A group of five renowned detectives, each accompanied by a relative or associate, is invited to "dinner and a murder" by the mysterious Lionel Twain. Having lured his guests to his mansion managed by a blind butler named Jamessir Bensonmum, who is later joined by a deaf, mute, and illiterate cook named Yetta, Twain joins his guests at dinner. He presses a button which seals off the house. Twain announces that he is the greatest criminologist in the world. To prove his claim, he challenges the guests to solve a murder that will occur at midnight; a reward of $1 million will be presented to the winner.

Before midnight, the butler is found dead. Twain disappears, only to re-appear immediately after midnight, stabbed twelve times in the back with a butcher knife. The cook is also discovered to have been an animated mannequin, now packed in a storage crate. The party spends the rest of the night investigating and bickering. They are manipulated by a mysterious behind-the-scenes force, confused by red herrings, and baffled by the "mechanical marvel" that is Twain's house. They ultimately find their own lives threatened. Each sleuth presents his or her theory on the case, pointing out the others' past connections to Twain and their possible motives for murdering him.

When they retire to their guest rooms for the night, the guests are each confronted by things that threaten to kill them: a deadly snake, a venomous scorpion, a descending ceiling, poison gas, and a bomb. They all survive, and in the morning, they gather in the office, where they find the butler waiting, very much alive and not blind. Each detective presents a different piece of evidence with which they each independently solved the mystery, and in each case, they accuse the butler of being one of Twain's former associates.

At first, the butler plays the part of each person with whom he is identified, but then he pulls off a mask to reveal Lionel Twain himself, alive. Twain disparages the detectives—and metafictionally, the authors who created them—for the way their adventures have been handled. He points out such authorial misdeeds as introducing crucial characters at the last minute for the traditional "twist in the tale" (something the assembled detectives had been doing a few minutes earlier) and withholding clues and information to make it impossible for the reader to solve the mystery. Each of the detectives departs the house empty-handed, none of them having won the $1 million. When asked whether there had been a murder, Wang replies, "Yes: killed good weekend."

Alone, Twain pulls off yet another mask to reveal Yetta, who lights a cigarette and laughs maniacally while rings of tobacco smoke fill the screen.

Cast and characters
The story takes place in and around the isolated country home populated by eccentric multi-millionaire Lionel Twain (Truman Capote), his blind butler Jamessir Bensonmum (Alec Guinness), and a deaf-mute cook named Yetta (Nancy Walker). "Lionel Twain" is a pun on "Lionel Train". The participants are all pastiches of famous fictional detectives:
 Inspector Sidney Wang (Peter Sellers in yellowface) is based on Earl Derr Biggers' Chinese/Hawaiian police detective Charlie Chan and is appropriately accompanied by his adopted Japanese son Willie (Richard Narita). Wang wears elaborate Chinese costumes, and his comically broken English is criticized by Twain and others.
 Dick and Dora Charleston (David Niven and Maggie Smith) are polished, sophisticated society types modeled on Dashiell Hammett's characters Nick and Nora Charles from the Thin Man film series. The Charles' wire-haired terrier "Asta" is also lampooned, appearing here named "Myron".
 Milo Perrier (James Coco) is a take on Agatha Christie's Hercule Poirot and arrives at the house with his heavily French-accented chauffeur Marcel Cassette (James Cromwell in his first feature film role). The demanding, portly Perrier is overly fond of food and appears annoyed that he must share a room with the lowly Marcel, although the two are later seen sharing not only a room but a bed, quibbling like a married couple. Perrier is repeatedly annoyed by being mistaken for a Frenchman as he is Belgian, saying, "I am not a 'Frenchie'...I am a 'Belgie'."
 Sam Diamond (Peter Falk) parodies another Dashiell Hammett character, The Maltese Falcon's hardboiled Sam Spade, and is a caricature of Humphrey Bogart in his Casablanca  character. He is accompanied by his long-suffering, hard-boiled, sexy but needy secretary Tess Skeffington (Eileen Brennan), whom he continually denigrates and mistreats. Tess Skeffington's name is a riff on Spade's secretary Effie Perine.
 Jessica Marbles (Elsa Lanchester) parodies Christie's Miss Marple. In the film, Marbles appears as hearty, robust and tweed-clad, wheeling a frail, ancient-looking, seemingly senile companionher ancient "nurse" Miss Withers (Estelle Winwood), for whom she is now caringwho everyone initially assumes is Miss Marbles.

Production
The film was shot entirely at Warner Bros. Studios in Burbank, California, then named "The Burbank Studios".

Charles Addams, creator of The Addams Family, drew the art and caricatures displayed at the beginning, during the end credits, and on the poster.

Deleted scenes
An additional scene, not in the theatrical version but shown in some television versions, shows Sherlock Holmes (Keith McConnell) and Doctor Watson (Richard Peel) arriving as the other guests are leaving. Author Ron Haydock states that an early draft of Neil Simon's script featured Holmes and Watson actually solving the mystery, but their roles were reduced to a cameo appearance and finally deleted, as the lead actors felt they were being "upstaged".

There were three other scenes deleted from the film:
En route to the Twain mansion, the Charlestons nearly run down Tess Skeffington, who is returning to Sam Diamond's car with gasoline; instead of giving her a lift, they apologize and drive on.
Upon arriving at the Twain mansion, Jessica Marbles' London cabbie lets her know the fare. 
After Twain's murder, Willie Wang claims to have found a clue in the dead man's hand that was overlooked by the great detectives; the clue, a note from "Lionel Twain, deceased", turns out to only be a reminder to the milkman to stop delivery.

Novelization
A novelization based on Neil Simon's script was written by H.R.F. Keating and published in the United States by Warner Books and by Star Books in the United Kingdom. The novelization contains the deleted Tess Skeffington and Willie Wang scenes, as well as a totally different ending in which Bensonmum is revealed to be still alive and Twain admits that although the detectives failed, they failed brilliantly and have made him love them all again.

Reception
Vincent Canby of The New York Times wrote that the film had one of Simon's "nicest, breeziest screenplays," with James Coco "very, very funny as the somewhat prissy take-off on Hercule Poirot" and David Niven and Maggie Smith "marvelous as Dick and Dora Charleston, though they haven't enough to do." Arthur D. Murphy of Variety called it "a very good silly-funny Neil Simon satirical comedy, with a super all-star cast," adding, "It's the sort of film one could see more than once and pick up on comedy bits unnoticed at first. Dave Grusin's music is another highlight." Charles Champlin of the Los Angeles Times found the film "amusing" but added, "Why it is only amusing, and not hilarious, madcap, riotous, rip-roaring, or richly romping, I don't entirely know. It's a short movie (94 minutes) but a slow one, surprisingly so when you'd have said knockabout speed was called for." Gene Siskel of the Chicago Tribune gave the film three stars out of four and wrote that "after getting off to a shaky start, the picture quickly hits a speedball comedy pace it doesn't lose until the unsatisfactory unravelling of the mystery."<ref>Siskel, Gene (June 25, 1976). "'Murder' is a comedy—and why it works is no mystery". Chicago Tribune. Section 3, p. 1.</ref> Gary Arnold of The Washington Post stated that "this burlesque whodunit is probably too static and thinly contrived to generate a lasting sense of pleasure, but it's the kind of skillfully obvious, mock-innocent spoof that seems good fun while it lasts, and the fun is enhanced by the most adept and attractive comedy cast in recent memory." John Simon wrote, "Murder by Death is not a movie to write or read about, but to be seen and modestly enjoyed".

On Rotten Tomatoes, Murder by Death holds a rating of 65% from 20 reviews.

Award nominations

See also
 The Cheap Detective, a 1978 film featuring Falk, Brennan, Coco, and Cromwell, also written by Simon and directed by Moore.
 Clue, a 1985 murder-mystery comedy featuring Brennan
 Ten Little Indians by Agatha Christie, a mystery novel with similar setting
 "And Then There Were Fewer", Family Guy episode with similar setting
 List of films featuring the deaf and hard of hearing
 Knives Out'', 2019 film featuring Christopher Plummer, Daniel Craig and Jamie Lee Curtis.

References

External links

 
 
 
 
 
 

1976 films
1976 comedy films
1970s American films
1970s comedy mystery films
1970s English-language films
1970s parody films
American comedy mystery films
American detective films
American parody films
Films directed by Robert Moore
Films scored by Dave Grusin
Films set in country houses
Films shot in Burbank, California
Films with screenplays by Neil Simon
Murder mystery films